Carlos René Correa (18 September 1912, Rauco – 13 September 1999, Santiago) was a Chilean poet.

References

Chilean male poets
1912 births
1999 deaths